Eight Mile Plains busway station is the southernmost station on the South East Busway in Brisbane, Australia serving the suburb of Eight Mile Plains. It opened on 30 April 2001 when the busway was extended from Woolloongabba.

It is currently the last station on the South East Busway, and is connected to the Springwood bus station by the Pacific Motorway. It is enclosed by a number of major roads including Logan Road, Miles Platting Road, the Pacific Motorway and the Gateway Motorway. It features a free park & ride facility.

As part of the upgrade of the Pacific Motorway between Eight Mile Plains and Daisy Hill commenced in 2020, the South East Busway will be extended to Springwood bus station. The Pacific Highway upgrade and the Busway extension is expected to be completed in 2024.  Eight Mile Plains will then no longer be the last station on the Busway.

Services
Eight Mile Plains busway station is served by 10 routes operated by Brisbane Transport, Clarks Logan City Bus Service, Mt Gravatt Bus Service and Transdev Queensland as part of the TransLink network.

References

External links
[ Eight Mile Plains station] TransLink

Bus stations in Brisbane
Transport infrastructure completed in 2001